Paris Babis (born 17 July 1999) is a Greek professional footballer who plays as a midfielder for Super League 2 club Athens Kallithea.

Career

AEK Athens
On 21 August 2017, Babis signed a professional contract with AEK Athens.

On 31 October 2018, Babis made his debut in Greek Cup in a 4–0 away win game against Apollon Larissa.

Loan moves
On 28 January 2019, Babis was loaned to Apollon Pontus.

On 7 September 2019, Babis signed with Football League club Kalamata.

On 31 January 2020, Babis moved to Super League 2 club Platanias.

On 6 October 2020, he was loaned to Apollon Larissa.

Career statistics

Honours
AEK Athens
Superleague: 2017–18

References

External links

1999 births
Living people
Super League Greece players
Football League (Greece) players
Super League Greece 2 players
AEK Athens F.C. players
AEK Athens F.C. B players
Apollon Pontou FC players
Kalamata F.C. players
Platanias F.C. players
Apollon Larissa F.C. players
Association football midfielders
Footballers from Athens
Greek footballers